The Hiro Naval Arsenal (Hiro Kaigun Kōshō or Dai-Jūichi Kaigun Kōkū-shō (11th Naval Arsenal), often abbreviated as Hiroshō) at Kure (呉), Hiroshima prefecture, was a production facility for seaplanes, flying boats, and aero engines for the Imperial Japanese Navy before and during World War II. It was largely destroyed in a raid by B-29 Superfortresses on 5 May 1945.

Aircraft

Designed and produced:

 Hiro G2H - long-range bomber
 Hiro H1H - biplane flying boat developed from the Felixstowe F.5
 Hiro H2H - biplane flying boat developed from the Supermarine Southampton II
 Hiro H4H - flying boat

Prototypes and experimental aircraft:

 Hiro R-3 - flying boat, 1 example built
 Hiro H3H1 - flying boat, 1 example built
 Hiro H10H - project only, never completed

Aircraft designed by other manufacturers produced at Hiro:

 Yokosuka B3Y
 Nakajima B5N "Kate"
 Aichi E13A "Jake"
 Yokosuka D4Y "Judy"

Engines

 Hiro Type 14
 Hiro Type 61
 Hiro Type 91
 Hiro Type 94

References
 

Defunct aircraft manufacturers of Japan
Defunct aircraft engine manufacturers of Japan
History of Hiroshima Prefecture